Sanitec was  a large European producer of sanitaryware. It was based in Helsinki, owned by the Swedish private equity firm EQT (has been owning 77.5% of Sanitec since 2009, 100% before) and owned several European ceramics brands with 18 production plants. Annual revenue in 2012 was €753 million.

History 
Sanitec was established as a subsidiary of Wärtsilä in 1990. In 1999 Sanitec was listed on the Helsinki stock exchange. It was delisted on 1 November 2001 after being acquired by Pool Acquisition Helsinki Oy, a company Sanitec merged with on 31 March 2002. In the beginning of 2005 the merged company was completely acquired by EQT.

In February 2015, Sanitec was acquired by the Swiss firm Geberit for $US1.4 billion.

Brands (year acquisition by Sanitec)Sanitec brands 

 Allia, France (1991)
 IDO, Finland
 Ifö, Sweden (1981)
 Keramag, Germany (1991)
 Kolo, Poland (1993)
 Koralle, Germany
 Porsgrund, Norway (1985)
 Pozzi-Ginori, Italy (1993)
 Selles, France
 Sphinx, Netherlands (1999)
 Twyford Bathrooms, United Kingdom (2001)
 Varicor, Germany (1998)

References

External links
  Sanitec homepage

Manufacturing companies based in Helsinki
Bathroom fixture companies
Finnish brands
Wärtsilä